The Dadri Road is an under construction metro station of the Noida Metro railway, in the city of Noida in India.

References

External links

Noida Metro stations
Railway stations in Gautam Buddh Nagar district
Transport in Noida